Dangerous Dreams is the debut studio album by American dance-punk band Moving Units. It was released on October 12, 2004, by Palm Records. It was their second release, after their 2002 Moving Units EP.

The track "Between Us & Them" was used in Leo Romero's opening part in Foundation's skateboarding video That's Life. The track "Going for Adds" was used in a 2007 commercial for Secret Anti-Perspirant Deodorant.

Critical reception
Dangerous Dreams was met with "mixed or average" reviews from critics. At Metacritic, which assigns a weighted average rating out of 100 to reviews from mainstream publications, this release received an average score of 53 based on 12 reviews.

In a review for AllMusic, critic reviewer Heather Phares wrote: "Dangerous Dreams mix of uptight rhythms, angular guitars, and shouty, faux-Brit vocals doesn't invoke nostalgia for late '70s and early '80s. A case of too little, too late, nothing on Moving Units' full-length debut Dangerous Dreams does anything to disprove the feeling that the dance-punk scene is at best overcrowded and at worst approaching rigor mortis any day now." David Spain of LAS Magazine said: "Dangerous Dreams is a passable album that never achieves greatness, nor does it fail miserably, rather residing with the mundane. Jangled, angular guitars and pungent bass lines meander their way through 12 tracks, laced with British-inspired LA vocals."

Writing for Pitchfork, Sam Ubl explained: "Dangerous Dreams is plagued by a pervasive feeling of been there/done that, and the album ultimately sounds like the same two or three tracks on repeat. Moving Units may not be directly responsible for dance-punk's fustiness, but they can't help but suffer from it."

Track listing

Personnel
Credits adapted from AllMusic.

Moving Units
 Blake Miller – vocals
 Johal Bogeli − bass
 Chris Hathwell – drums

Production
 Chris Hathwell – producer
 Blake Miller – mixing, producer
 Mickey Petralia – engineer, mixing, producer
 Louie Teran – mastering
 Richard Kaplan – engineer
 Colby Buddelmeyer – engineer
 Josh Achziger − engineer

References

Moving Units albums
2004 debut albums
Albums produced by Mickey Petralia